Tina Cardinale-Beauchemin ( Beauchemin, previously Cardinale; born October 20, 1966, in Hudson, Massachusetts) is a member of the Northeastern University athletics Hall of Fame. She was elected in 2002 for her excellence in women's ice hockey and was also the captain of the first ever United States women's national hockey team during the 1990 IIHF Women's World Championship. Cardinale was also on the American national team for the 1992 IIHF Women's World Championship.

During her first season as a women's Northeastern University ice hockey player (called the Huskies), Cardinale scored 19 goals with 13 assists for 32 points. In her sophomore season she scored 15 goals and 20 assists for 35 points. Her junior season she was named an ECAC All-Star she scored 18 goals and 30 assists for 48 points.

Cardinale saved her best effort for her senior season where Northeastern went 26-0-1 and she scored 18 goals and 41 assists for 59 points. Cardinale was named an Eastern College Athletic Conference (ECAC) All-Star for the second time.

References

External links
 GoNU.com Hall of Fame Profile

1966 births
Living people
American women's ice hockey forwards
Ice hockey players from Massachusetts
Northeastern Huskies women's ice hockey players
People from Hudson, Massachusetts
Sportspeople from Middlesex County, Massachusetts